Those Nervous Animals is an Irish rock band from Sligo, Ireland. Formed in 1981, the original membership consisted of lead vocalist, guitarist and keyboardist Barry Brennan, guitarist Padraig Meehan, bassist Eddie Lee and percussionist Cathal Hayden.

The band released six singles in the 1980’s/early 90’s, and (in 1985) a mini-album, Hyperspace!. A new album of material recorded over four decades, The Mission Sessions, was released in 2021. A number of songs from this were released as singles.

History

Formation and early years 
Those Nervous Animals were formed in 1981 by Barry Brennan and Padraig Meehan (who met in Sligo art college in the 1970s) and Eddie Lee. The band were named following a word-play game in a Sligo restaurant. The band's songs combined funky, radio-friendly pop tunes, with quirky and ironic material. The band was originally managed and produced by Riverdance composer Bill Whelan. At the peak of their success, Those Nervous Animals were a major draw in Ireland, filling the Baggot Inn, Dublin, regularly on a Thursday night residency, and performing at the Self Aid concert in 1986. They performed shows across Ireland, including events in the late 1980's in the National Stadium and Frances Xavier Hall. Those Nervous Animals never played or released records outside Ireland.

Singles released by the band included Just What the Sucker Wanted, The Business Enterprise (My Friend John), How Does the Shopper Feel? and Damien.  They worked with a number of notable producers, including Bill Whelan, and Donal Lunny. The early singles were released on their own Dead Fly label. Some of these songs are included (remastered) on tne Hyperspace! mini-album.

Band reunion 
The three core TNA members Pádraig Meehan, Eddie Lee and Barry Brennan  steered the band through a number of personnel changes over the years. This trio also contributed the  songs that characterised the Animals style. Guitarist Seamie McGowan played on many of the recordings and toured with the band. Among the performers associated with the band is Clonmel keyboard player John Tobin, who played the jazz solo on How does the Shopper Feel? and the French percussionist (now deceased) Pascale Benadjoud. Susan Rowland regularly provided vocals; at various times Helen Walsh, Flo McSweeney and Maura O’Connell performed vocal backing with TNA. The band had strong associations with the Sligo pub, Hennigans of Wine Street, where they played and socialised in the 1980s.

Having toured in Ireland for a number of years the group disbanded in 1988, but since 1993 they have performed together regularly on a part-time basis. 
Those Nervous Animals returned with a tour and a CD Single, Rocket Ship, in 1994, on Danceline Records.
In 2002 Tom Dunne of Today FM put the song The Business Enterprise (My Friend John) on his Top 30 Irish Hits Volume 2 collection. Today FM listeners voted the song number 16 among the best Irish singles of all time. In 2003 Those Nervous Animals contributed a new track - Polar Bear - to the Simpatico album, in honour of the late Finn Corrigan, musician and sound engineer. The song Hyperspace was featured on the album Quare Groove Vol.1 released in 2018 by All City Records.

The band released their first full-length album, The Mission Sessions, on March 26, 2021. It included a 50/50 mix of remasters of older material and material recorded in the 2020 Covid-19 lockdown.

Personnel

Current members 
Vocals, guitar, keyboards – Barry Brennan
Vocals, Susan Rowland
Guitar, keyboards – Padraig Meehan
Bass, keyboards – Eddie Lee
Drums – Tom Jamieson

Discography

Extended plays

Singles

References

External links
 Sligo Arts webpage - Artist profile on Those Nervous Animals
 Homepage

Irish rock music groups
Musical groups from County Sligo
Musical groups established in 1981